Lene Revsbeck Jensen (born 17 March 1976) is a Danish former football forward. She played for Brøndby IF and the Denmark women's national football team.

Between 2006 and 2011 Jensen scored 52 goals in 156 games across all competitions for Brøndby, placing her tenth in the club's all–time appearance list.

She made her senior Denmark debut in September 1996, entering play as a substitute in a 7–1 UEFA Women's Championship qualification play–off win in Portugal. She continued to be selected throughout the following decade, playing at the 1999 FIFA Women's World Cup as well as the UEFA Women's Championship in 2001 and 2005.

In June 2008 Jensen was recalled to the Denmark squad after a two–year absence for a UEFA Women's Euro 2009 qualifying match in Ukraine.

References

External links
Danish Football Union (DBU) statistics

1976 births
Living people
Danish women's footballers
Denmark women's international footballers
FIFA Century Club
VSK Aarhus (women) players
Brøndby IF (women) players
Women's association football forwards
1999 FIFA Women's World Cup players